Premnotrypini is a weevil tribe in the subfamily Entiminae.

Genera 
Microtrypes – Premnotrypes – Rhinotrypes

References 

 Kuschel, G. 1956: Revisión de los Premnotrypini y adiciones a los Bagoini. Boletín del Museo Nacional de Historia Natural (Santiago), 26(6): 187–235.
 Alonso-Zarazaga, M.A.; Lyal, C.H.C. 1999: A world catalogue of families and genera of Curculionoidea (Insecta: Coleoptera) (excepting Scolytidae and Platypodidae). Entomopraxis, Barcelona.

External links 

Entiminae
Beetle tribes